The president of El Salvador, officially known as the President of the Republic of El Salvador, is the head of state and head of government of El Salvador. He is also, by Constitutional Law, the commander-in-chief of the Armed Forces of El Salvador. The office was created in the Constitution of 1841. From 1821 until 1841, the head of state of El Salvador was styled simply as Head of State (Jefe de Estado).

The President of the Republic of El Salvador begins their duties on 1 June of the year of their election and is accompanied by a vice president.

According to the Electoral Code, for a person to be declared President-Elect of the Republic, they must obtain 50% plus one of the votes obtained in the election in the presidential elections. If none of the candidates gets to obtain that result, a second voting round will be held where the two candidates who have obtained the most electoral votes in the first round will participate.

The duration of the presidential term is five years and the president is eligible for reelection once consecutively as of 2021.

Each 1 June, the president is accountable to the Legislative Assembly for the contributions and Government Development that the president, the vice president and the Council of Ministers developed from the beginning of the presidential term.

History

In 1824, the Mayor's Office of Sonsonate and the Intendancy of San Salvador joined to form the State of El Salvador, united first to the United Provinces of Central America and then to the Federal Republic of Central America. According to the federal law, the governor received the title of Supreme Chief until 1841, when El Salvador declared itself independent, with its governor being called President. From then on, four stages with particular characteristics are recognized: the post-federal period, the Coffee Republic, the military governments, and civil governments.

In 1841, El Salvador was constituted as an independent and sovereign nation after the rupture of the Federal Republic of Central America in 1838. At that time, the legislative body created a constitution to legitimize the nation of El Salvador and also named Juan Lindo Provisional President of the Republic of El Salvador on 2 February 1841. It was not until 26 September 1842 Juan José Guzmán was elected by the people as President of El Salvador. From that moment, the republic suffered a constant series of provisional governments that brought many leaders to power.

In 1858, Captain General Gerardo Barrios became President of the Republic in which his government gave entrance to the "French Bread". He resigned from power in 1863 and Francisco Dueñas became President.

It was not until the Constitution of the Republic of El Salvador of 1886 was ratified when the presidential term is increased from two to four years, beginning and ending the presidential terms on 1 March. In 1913, before the death of Manuel Enrique Araujo, a family 'dynasty' would begin. The Meléndez-Quiñonez Dynasty lasted 18 years until Arturo Araujo became President.

In 1931, a coup d'état led by Vice President General Maximiliano Hernández Martínez overthrew President Araujo. This dictatorial government would establish the foundations of a rigid and totally militarized nation. It was not until 1939 when General Martínez called for a Constituent Assembly to draft a new constitution which established that the presidential term would be increased from 4 to 6 years and would begin and end on 1 January. During his presidency, Martínez initiated the 1932 Salvadoran Peasant Massacre which killed 25,000 indigenous peoples. Martínez would be overthrown 12 years later in 1944 and General Andrés Ignacio Menéndez became Provisional President.

From that moment, the presidency of the Republic once again showed dictatorial instability and military governments began to be established to the point of creating a republic with 'Military Authoritarianism' which would end in 1982. In 1950, Lieutenant Colonel Óscar Osorio constitutionally became the president of the Republic and a new constitution was drafted where the presidential term would be 6 years and begin and end on 14 September. Osorio was known as the president of the social programs since he implemented and founded programs such as the Urban Housing Institute (IVU), the Autonomous Port Executive Commission (CEPA) among others that benefited the nation.

In 1960, a coup d'état overthrew President José María Lemus which led to the formation of a Junta of Government which would later be overthrown by the Civic-Military Directory in 1961. This was the case until the constitutional order was reestablished and another constitution was created in 1962 which would bring with it significant presidential reforms. From that moment, the presidential term would last 5 years and begin and end on 1 July.

On 15 October 1979, the last coup d'état in Salvadoran history took place where a group of young soldiers and officers overthrew General Carlos Humberto Romero. The coup marked the beginning of the Salvadoran Civil War which would rage on from 1979 to 1992. The Revolutionary Government Junta was established and ruled over El Salvador while fighting against the communist guerrilla group Farabundo Martí National Liberation Front (FMLN). The Junta was abolished in 1982 and Álvaro Magaña became President of the Republic. The 1983 Constituent Assembly decided to create the current Constitution of El Salvador which set presidential terms to 5 years and would begin and end on June 1. The civil war greatly affected the political stability of the country.

President José Napoleón Duarte would lead the government against the FMLN from 1984 to 1989. In 1989, the Nationalist Republican Alliance (ARENA) won the 1989 presidential election. Alfredo Cristiani became the first president of ARENA. ARENA won the presidential elections in 1989, 1994, 1999, and 2004. Its presidents were Alfredo Cristiani, Armando Calderón Sol, Francisco Flores, and Elías Antonio Saca.

The Civil War ended in 1992 and the FMLN became a legal political party in accordance to the Chapultepec Peace Accords.

In 20 years of government, El Salvador was characterized by the privatization of national services such as coffee, telecommunications, the pension system, the National Bank, the Electric Power Service, among others. In 2001, the Economic Dollarization System was carried out in the country, a measure adopted by then President Francisco Flores which would have great long-term consequences for the Salvadoran economy and adopted the US dollar as legal currency.

Mauricio Funes won the 2009 presidential election ending 20 years of ARENA rule and marked the first FMLN presidency. Salvador Sánchez Cerén became the second FMLN president in 2015 after narrowly defeating Norman Quijano.

In 2019, Nayib Bukele, from the Grand Alliance for National Unity (GANA), won the 2019 presidential election ending 10 years of FMLN rule. He was the first president since Duarte to not be a member of either ARENA or FMLN. He was the second president from Palestinian descent, after Elías Antonio Saca. He was inaugurated on 1 June 2019.

Heads of state of El Salvador within the Federal Republic of Central America (1821–1841)

Intendants political leaders of the Province of San Salvador

Political parties

Heads of state of El Salvador

Political parties

Presidents of El Salvador (1841–present)

Early republic (1841–1885) 

Political parties

First military dictatorship (1885–1911) 

Political parties

Meléndez–Quiñónez dynasty (1911–1931) 

Political parties

Second military dictatorship (1931–1979) 

Political parties

Modern republic (1979–present) 

Political parties

Latest election

See also 

El Salvador
Colonial Intendant of San Salvador
History of El Salvador

References

External links
 El Presidencia de El Salvador 

 
El Salvador
Government of El Salvador
1841 establishments in El Salvador